BLVD may refer to:

 Boulevard, a type of street
 Boulevard (Canadian band), formerly named BLVD
 BLVD Place, a property in Houston, Texas, United States

See also
 BD (disambiguation)
 Boulevard (disambiguation)